KUNS-TV (channel 51) is a television station licensed to Bellevue, Washington, United States, serving the Seattle area as an affiliate of the Spanish-language Univision network. It is owned by Sinclair Broadcast Group alongside ABC affiliate KOMO-TV (channel 4). Both stations share studios within KOMO Plaza (formerly Fisher Plaza) in the Lower Queen Anne section of Seattle, while KUNS-TV's transmitter is located in the city's Queen Anne neighborhood.

History

On February 10, 1988, the Federal Communications Commission (FCC) issued a construction permit for television station KBEH.  However, channel 51 would not begin its broadcasting operation until August 8, 1999, transmitting programs from the ValueVision network, which became ShopNBC in 2001 after NBC (now part of Comcast) acquired a 37% ownership stake in that network. In December 2000, the station would change its call letters to KWOG. Previously locally owned and operated and at one point being minority owned, the station was sold to Fisher Communications on September 29, 2006.

On October 31, 2006, the station would change its call letters one more time, this time to the current KUNS-TV. On January 1, 2007, it rang in the year by going from broadcasting home shopping programs to broadcasting Hispanic programming as a Univision affiliate almost instantly, providing viewers with programs such as Sabado Gigante, Despierta América and El Gordo y La Flaca, in addition to an assortment of telenovelas, along with many other programs. The station also started its own local newscast, Noticias Noroeste with Jaime Méndez and Roxy de la Torre. The newscast originates from a studio at KOMO Plaza (formerly Fisher Plaza) in Seattle.

On August 21, 2012, Fisher Communications signed an affiliation agreement with MundoFox, a Spanish-language competitor to Univision that is owned as a joint venture between Fox International Channels and Colombian broadcaster RCN TV, for KUNS and Portland sister station KUNP to be carried on both stations as digital subchannels starting in late September. On April 11, 2013, Fisher announced that it would sell its properties, including KUNS-TV, to the Sinclair Broadcast Group. The deal was completed on August 8, 2013.

On May 8, 2017, Sinclair Broadcast Group entered into an agreement to acquire Tribune Media—owner of Fox affiliate KCPQ (channel 13) and MyNetworkTV affiliate KZJO (channel 22)—for $3.9 billion, plus the assumption of $2.7 billion in debt held by Tribune, pending regulatory approval by the FCC and the U.S. Department of Justice's Antitrust Division; the merger would have required divestitures in the Seattle market, as broadcasters are not currently allowed to legally own more than two full-power television stations in a single market. On April 24, 2018, Sinclair disclosed that it would buy KZJO and sell KUNS-TV to Howard Stirk Holdings, while continuing to provide services to the station; KCPQ would concurrently be sold to Fox Television Stations, which would make KCPQ a Fox owned-and-operated station.

Three weeks after the FCC's July 18 vote to have the deal reviewed by an administrative law judge amid "serious concerns" about Sinclair's forthrightness in its applications to sell certain conflict properties, on August 9, 2018, Tribune announced it would terminate the Sinclair deal, intending to seek other M&A opportunities. Tribune also filed a breach of contract lawsuit in the Delaware Chancery Court, alleging that Sinclair engaged in protracted negotiations with the FCC and the U.S. Department of Justice's Antitrust Division over regulatory issues, refused to sell stations in markets where it already had properties, and proposed divestitures to parties with ties to Sinclair executive chair David D. Smith that were rejected or highly subject to rejection to maintain control over stations it was required to sell. The termination of the Sinclair sale agreement places uncertainty for the future of Fox's purchases of KCPQ and the other six Tribune stations included in that deal, which were predicated on the closure of the Sinclair–Tribune merger.

Technical information

Subchannels
The station's ATSC 1.0 channels are carried on the multiplexed digital signals of other Seattle television stations:

Analog-to-digital conversion
KUNS-TV shut down its analog signal, over UHF channel 51, on June 12, 2009, as part of the federally mandated transition from analog to digital television. The station's digital signal remained on its pre-transition UHF channel 50, using PSIP to display KUNS-TV's virtual channel as 51 on digital television receivers.

ATSC 3.0

Availability on cable and satellite

"Must-carry" regulations imposed by the FCC require most cable television providers across western Washington to carry KUNS on their lineups. In the past, the station was not available on all cable systems, as many of these providers were under carriage agreements for the national cable feed for the network, which allowed them control of several minutes throughout the day of local commercial time that would not be available if they instead carried KUNS. Retransmission consent agreements for providers in the Seattle market made after Sinclair's purchase of the station effectively made carriage of KUNS compulsory to carry KOMO-TV (along with its subchannels), though some smaller systems in communities with a low Spanish-speaking population have been given a waiver from KUNS carriage.

KUNS is available on satellite television through DirecTV on channel 45, and is also available on Dish Network channels 51 and 8624—the network's national East and West Coast feeds are also still available to satellite customers.

Also, neither the station nor the network is available on cable or satellite systems in Canada. This is because the Canadian Radio-television and Telecommunications Commission (CRTC) did not approve the network or any of its affiliates to be carried on cable/satellite systems for Canadian audiences. This was eventually rectified as Telelatino's all-Spanish network, launched on October 23, 2007 with Univision content, was relaunched with a brand licensing agreement with Univision as Univision Canada on May 5, 2014.

Logos

References

External links 
Univision Seattle (KUNS-TV)
http://www.fcc.gov/Bureaus/Cable/Orders/2001/da012297.txt
http://www.fcc.gov/Bureaus/Cable/Orders/2002/da020047.txt
http://www.fcc.gov/Bureaus/Cable/Orders/2002/da020048.txt
http://www.fcc.gov/Bureaus/Cable/Orders/2001/da012350.txt

Univision network affiliates
TBD (TV network) affiliates
Stadium (sports network) affiliates
UNS-TV
Television channels and stations established in 1999
1999 establishments in Washington (state)
UNS-TV
Sinclair Broadcast Group
ATSC 3.0 television stations